The Albona class were mine warfare ships used by the Regia Marina (Royal Italian Navy) and Royal Yugoslav Navy (KJRM). Fourteen ships were originally laid down between 1917 and 1918 for the Austro-Hungarian Navy as the MT.130 class. However, the end of World War I and the dissolution of Austria-Hungary left them incomplete until 1920, when three ships were finished for the Regia Marina. An additional five ships were completed for the KJRM in 1931 as the Malinska class.

The five ships in KJRM service were captured by Italian forces during the Axis invasion of Yugoslavia and commissioned in the Regia Marina as the Arbe class. Following the Italian Armistice in 1943, the three Albona-class ships were captured by German forces with all three being lost or scuttled later in the war. Of the five former KJRM ships, one was seized and operated by the Kriegsmarine until it was lost; a second one was handed over to the Navy of the Independent State of Croatia and lost in 1944. The remaining three were returned to the KJRM-in-exile and were later commissioned in the new Yugoslav Navy.

Background 
Fourteen ships were laid down at the Ganz & Danubius shipyard at Porto Re (now Kraljevica) between October 1917 and September 1918 as the MT.130 class for the Austro-Hungarian Navy (k.u.k. Kriegsmarine). The vessels were originally designed as minelayers, but the Navy ordered six of them completed as minesweepers. All were eventually fitted for minesweeping during construction. By September 1918, only the first three had been launched, and even they had not been fully completed. The end of World War I and the dissolution of Austria-Hungary left the ships in various stages of completion, the shipyard itself now part of the newly formed Kingdom of Serbs, Croats and Slovenes (renamed Yugoslavia in 1929). With the creation of the new kingdom, the Ganz & Danubius shipyard became Jadranska Brodogradilišta.

Description and construction 
The first three ships of the class, MT.130–132, were completed by the shipyard for the Regia Marina (Royal Italian Navy) in 1920 as the Albona class, and were commissioned  as Albona, Laurana and Rovigno, respectively. Five other ships, MT.133–137, were completed in 1931 for the Royal Yugoslav Navy (KJRM) as the Malinska class, and were commissioned as Malinska, Marjan, Meljine, Mljet and Mosor, respectively. The hulls of MT.138–MT-143 were 45% complete by October 1918 but were never completed.

The crew consisted of 27 officers and enlisted men. They had two triple-expansion steam engines, with steam provided by a single oil-fired Yarrow boiler. The armament planned for the class consisted of a single  L/44 gun, two  machine guns and 24–39 naval mines.

Ships

Service history

Albona class
In 1941, Laurana was fitted with smoke apparatus to assist in the defence of Venice. Following the Italian Armistice in early September 1943, Albona and Rovigno were captured by the Germans at the island of Syros in the Aegean Sea on 10 September. They were renamed Netztender 57 and Netztender 56 respectively, and their armament was improved. Laurana was captured at Venice on 11 September, and was commissioned by the Germans under her Italian name on 30 September, after which she served as a minelayer in the Adriatic. She retained her Italian armament. Netztender 57 and Netztender 56 were scuttled by the Germans at Salonika on 31 October 1944 as they withdrew from the city, and Laurana was sunk at Trieste by Allied aircraft bombs on 20 February 1945.

Malinska class
By 1936, the Malinska class were classified as minelayers. At the start of the German-led Axis invasion of Yugoslavia, the five Malinska-class ships were assigned to the Coast Defence Command and spread over three sectors; Malinska in Selce (North Sector), Mosor and Marjan in Šibenik (Central Sector), and Mljet and Meljine in Kotor (South Sector). All five were soon captured by Italian forces, including Malinska which had been scuttled by its crew, but was raised by the Italians and commissioned as Arbe, along with Ugliano (ex-Marjan), Solta (ex-Meljine), Meleda (ex-Mljet) and Pasman (ex-Mosor). In Italian service they were known as the Arbe class, and could carry 30 mines. Following the Italian Armistice, Ugliano was taken over by German forces and probably lost in their hands. Pasman was also captured by the Germans, who handed it over to the Navy of the Independent State of Croatia. This ship was stranded on the Island of Ist on 31 December 1944, but was not scrapped until 1954.

Solta and Meleda were returned by the Italians to the KJRM-in-exile on 7 December 1943 and Arbe was returned on 16 February 1944; all reverted to their previous names. After the war, all three were commissioned in the Yugoslav Navy as M1 (ex-Solta), M2 (ex-Arbe) and M3 (ex-Meleda). They were later renamed M31 (ex-M1), M32 (ex-M2) and M33 (ex-M3). All three were re-armed with a single  gun. M32 was still in service in 1978.

See also 
List of ships of the Royal Yugoslav Navy
List of ships of the Yugoslav Navy

Notes

Footnotes

References 

 
 
 
 

 
 
 
 
 

Naval ships of Yugoslavia captured by Italy during World War II
Mine warfare vessels of the Royal Yugoslav Navy
Mine warfare vessels of Yugoslavia
Mine warfare vessels of the Yugoslav Navy
Naval ships of Yugoslavia captured by Germany during World War II